Bulia brunnearis is a moth of the family Erebidae. It is found in Jamaica, Haiti and the Dominican Republic.

References

Moths described in 1852
brunnearis
Moths of the Caribbean
Taxa named by Achille Guenée